Dragan Šarac (born 27 September 1975) is a Serbian football manager and former player.

Club career
After playing for his hometown club Sloven Ruma, Šarac joined ambitious Obilić in the summer of 1995. He was a regular member of the team that became champions of FR Yugoslavia for the 1997–98 season. In the summer of 1999, Šarac moved abroad to Bulgarian side CSKA Sofia, alongside several teammates. He stayed for only a couple of months and made three appearances in the 1999–2000 UEFA Cup, before returning to Obilić.

In July 2000, Šarac moved abroad for the second time and signed with Austria Wien. He spent two seasons at the club and then left for fellow Bundesliga side Pasching. In July 2003, Šarac returned to his homeland and joined Red Star Belgrade on a two-year contract. He played regularly in his debut season and helped the team win the double. In May 2005, Šarac moved back to Austria and signed with Sturm Graz for two years.

In July 2007, Šarac returned to Serbia and signed with Vojvodina. He was released the following January, alongside Saša Drakulić, after playing futsal without permission during the winter break.

International career
Between 1998 and 2004, Šarac was capped six times for Serbia and Montenegro (formerly known as FR Yugoslavia) at full level. He previously played for the national under-21 team.

Managerial career
After hanging up his boots, Šarac served as assistant manager to Nenad Lalatović at numerous clubs, including Voždovac, Napredak Kruševac, Red Star Belgrade, Borac Čačak, Vojvodina (two spells), Čukarički, Radnički Niš (three spells), Al Batin, Radnički 1923, and Borac Banja Luka.

In March 2023, Šarac was appointed as Nenad Lalatović's replacement as manager of Radnički Niš.

Honours
Obilić
 First League of FR Yugoslavia: 1997–98
Red Star Belgrade
 First League of Serbia and Montenegro: 2003–04
 Serbia and Montenegro Cup: 2003–04

References

External links
 
 
 
 
 

1975 births
Living people
People from Ruma
Serbia and Montenegro footballers
Serbian footballers
Association football defenders
Serbia and Montenegro under-21 international footballers
Serbia and Montenegro international footballers
FK Obilić players
PFC CSKA Sofia players
FK Austria Wien players
ASKÖ Pasching players
Red Star Belgrade footballers
SK Sturm Graz players
FK Vojvodina players
FK Laktaši players
FK Spartak Subotica players
FK Novi Pazar players
FK Voždovac players
First League of Serbia and Montenegro players
Austrian Football Bundesliga players
Serbian SuperLiga players
Premier League of Bosnia and Herzegovina players
Serbian First League players
Serbia and Montenegro expatriate footballers
Serbian expatriate footballers
Expatriate footballers in Bulgaria
Expatriate footballers in Austria
Expatriate footballers in Bosnia and Herzegovina
Serbia and Montenegro expatriate sportspeople in Bulgaria
Serbia and Montenegro expatriate sportspeople in Austria
Serbian expatriate sportspeople in Austria
Serbian expatriate sportspeople in Bosnia and Herzegovina
Serbian football managers
Red Star Belgrade non-playing staff
FK Radnički Niš managers
Serbian SuperLiga managers